Popular Problems is the thirteenth studio album by Canadian singer-songwriter Leonard Cohen, released on September 19, 2014 in Friday-release countries (such as France and Ireland) and on September 22, 2014 elsewhere.

Overview 
Most of the songs were new, though Cohen did debut "Born in Chains" onstage in 2010 and "My Oh My" was played during a soundcheck the same year.

The 2010 version of "Born in Chains" differs radically in terms of arrangements and singing compared to the 2014 studio version, and the song itself was first performed as early as 1985, during an (unofficially recorded) soundcheck in Europe. The early version used earlier lyrics set to the music which later become the song "I Can't Forget", released on Cohen's 1988 record I'm Your Man. Through the years, Cohen referred to the song as "Taken Out of Egypt", reciting it on show in 1988, and humming it to the new melody in 2005 documentary Leonard Cohen: I'm Your Man.

"A Street" was recited by Cohen in 2006, during promotion of his book of poetry Book of Longing, and later printed twice, as "A Street" in the March 2, 2009 issue of The New Yorker magazine, and as "Party's Over" in Everyman's Library edition of Cohen's Poems and Songs in 2011. Both versions include a verse referring to 9/11.

"Nevermind" was published as the poem in 2005 on The Leonard Cohen Files website, and in Book of Longing in 2006. In 2015, it was used as the opening credits theme of the second season of the HBO series True Detective.

Critical reception

Upon its release the album received uniformly positive reviews from critics, with Metacritic tallying 26 positive reviews for an aggregate score of 86, designated on the site as "universal acclaim". Thom Jurek of AllMusic wrote that, at 80 years old, "Cohen not only has plenty left in the tank, but is at his most confident and committed" and called it his best album since 1992's The Future. The New York Times gave a moderately positive review, calling Cohen "one of rock’s most profound aphorists" but dismissing the "bouncy country" production of "Did I Ever Love You" as the album's "major misstep". Neil McCormick of The Daily Telegraph called the album "a masterpiece".

The album was a shortlisted Juno Award nominee for Adult Alternative Album of the Year at the Juno Awards of 2015.

Commercial performance
The album peaked at number one on the Canadian Albums Chart, selling 20,000 copies in its first week. In its second week, the album fell to number two behind Bryan Adams's Tracks of My Years, with sales of 10,500. As of January 2015, Popular Problems has sold 80,000 copies in Canada.

In the United States, the album debuted at No. 15 on Billboard 200, No. 1 on Folk Albums and No. 4 on Top Rock Albums, with 20,000 copies sold.  The album has sold 67,000 copies in the US as of May 2015.

The song "You Got Me Singing" closes out the 2023 Netflix Documentary Hallelujah.

Track listing
Written by Leonard Cohen and Patrick Leonard, except where indicated

Personnel

Leonard Cohen – vocals
James Harrah – guitar
Joe Ayoub – bass
Alexandru Bublitchi – violin
Patrick Leonard – keyboards 
Brian MacLeod – drums
Charlean Carmon – backing vocals
Dana Glover – backing vocals
Donna De Lory – backing vocals

Chart positions

Weekly charts

Year-end charts

Certifications

Release history

References

2014 albums
Leonard Cohen albums
Columbia Records albums
Albums produced by Patrick Leonard
Juno Award for Album of the Year albums